Tadhg Ruadh Ó Cellaigh was the king of Uí Maine and a Chief of the Name. He died in 1410.

Notes

External links
http://www.ucc.ie/celt/published/T100005D/

Further reading

 The Tribes and customs of Hy-Many, John O'Donovan, 1843
 The Parish of Ballinasloe, Fr. Jerome A. Fahey.
 The Surnames of Ireland, Edward MacLysaght, Dublin, 1978.
 A New History of Ireland - lists and genealogies, vol. 9, Oxford University Press, 1984.

People from County Galway
People from County Roscommon
Kings of Uí Maine
15th-century Irish monarchs
Tadhg Ruadh